The Marin County Civic Center, designed by Frank Lloyd Wright, is located in San Rafael, California, United States. Groundbreaking for the Civic Center Administration Building took place in 1960, after Wright's death and under the watch of Wright's protégé, Aaron Green; it was completed in 1962. The Hall of Justice was begun in 1966 and completed in 1969. Veterans Memorial Auditorium opened in 1971, and the Exhibit Hall opened in 1976.

Located away from the former county seat in downtown San Rafael, the expansive complex stretches across two valleys just east of US 101. Its pink stucco walls, blue roof and scalloped balconies are distinctive. The smaller wing is the county administration building and the larger wing is the Hall of Justice, joined by a round structure on a small hill that houses a branch of the Marin County Free Library.

A battle between factions of the Marin County Board of Supervisors played out through the selection of the site and the architect, the financing of the project, and its eventual completion. The Marin County Civic Center is a state and National Historic Landmark.

The nearby fairgrounds hosts the Marin Sonoma Concours d'Elegance each spring and the Marin County Fair in July.

Architecture
The selection of Frank Lloyd Wright in 1957 to design the Civic Center was controversial. The Civic Center project was Wright's largest public project, and encompassed an entire campus of civic structures. The post office was the only federal government project of Wright's career. Wright's design borrowed ideas and forms from Wright's Broadacre City concept, first published in 1932.

Main building

The Hall of Justice spans a small valley, arching twice over an access road and a parking area, while the Administration Building spans a smaller ravine. Both structures are entered through archways on their lower levels. The long principal facades are marked by shallow non-structural arches of decreasing span with each story. The arches, which are framed in metal with a stucco appliqué, overlap slightly at the lower level. On the intermediate level, they appear to stand on short slender gold-anodized columns, and on the top level, they become round openings with gold railings directly under the deep roof overhang. The railings themselves have a circular pattern. The bright blue roof is itself patterned with arched cut-outs and raised circular patterns The building wings are arranged as a barrel vault shape on either side of the central galley, asymmetrically disposed. Interior guardrails at the atrium are solid stucco with no metal elements. Entrances are controlled by vertical grills of gold-anodized metal with rounded tops and bottoms, rather than doors. The eaves are embellished with an arched fascia with small gold balls inset in each arch, a pattern repeated in the atria.

The rotunda on the central hill houses the county library and a central cafeteria. Its  gold spire was meant to house a radio transmitter, as well as the boiler plant's chimney. The interiors are arranged around open atria or "malls" as Wright called them, which allow natural light into the space. Originally open to the sky, the malls were later covered with skylights designed by William Wesley Peters. Interior spaces featured glass walls to allow light to penetrate from the exterior and the atrium, and to follow through on Wright's philosophy of maximum openness of government activities.

Wright's concept envisioned a gold-colored roof, which proved to be impossible to obtain in a long-lasting material. After Wright's death, Olgivanna Lloyd Wright chose a bright blue color that would weather well, gaining a softer color with age. The color choice, together with the pink stucco walls, was initially controversial, causing the building to become known as "Big Pink". The only large gold element is the spire at the rotunda.

Accessory buildings
The Post Office building is a one-story elliptical building near the entrance to the complex. Its facade repeats the arch motif, with circular embellishments on its canopy. The interior features an elliptical lobby.

The nearby Veterans' Memorial Auditorium was designed by the Taliesin Associated Architects and was completed in 1971 in a manner compatible with the main complex. The auditorium was designed for use by the county fair with a combination of flat-floor exhibition space and tiered seating spaces, using a compromise plan devised by Wesley Peters, George Izenour, and Aaron Green. The main hall seats 1960 in an amphitheater arrangement. A separate Showcase Theater seats 300, and the exhibition hall can accommodate up to 2000 patrons.

The original Hall of Justice design incorporated the Marin County Jail. As the jail outgrew its space a number of proposals were advanced for a new facility adjoining the Civic Center. A new, mostly underground jail was completed in 1994 in the hilltop immediately to the west of the Hall of Justice, designed by AECOM with 222 cells and 363 beds. The jail connects to the Hall of Justice by an underground link. The design concept was originally suggested by Aaron Green. The final design was reached after unsuitable underground and above-ground designs were rejected in the 1980s. Natural lighting of interior spaces is provided by skylit light wells over the common space of each of six pods.

A Sonoma–Marin Area Rail Transit train station was constructed nearby which bears the same name.

Politics

The Marin Civic Center arose from a desire to consolidate county services at a single location, away from the center of San Rafael. The same year a selection committee was convened to select an architect, interviewing 26 firms, with a strong showing from Richard Neutra. Frank Lloyd Wright was not interviewed and had indicated that he would not participate in a competitive selection. At the instigation of supervisor Vera Schultz, committee members and four county supervisors met Wright in June 1957 when he visited Berkeley to lecture at the University of California. Schultz was the most ardent backer of Frank Lloyd Wright as prospective civic center architect. If not for Schultz's support in the face of heated opposition, Wright's version of the center would never have been built. Schultz had the support of three of the men on the board, but the fourth, Supervisor William D. Fusselman, a conservative candy manufacturer from San Anselmo, attempted to prevent Wright from getting the commission. On June 27 the Board of Supervisors voted 4-1, with Fusselman dissenting, to retain Wright. Wright arrived in San Rafael two days later. He was 90 years old.

Fusselman, the holdout supervisor, represented a conservative base that was opposed to the rapid pace of change in Marin County and to the proposed move from the center of San Rafael. Wright's fee of 10% of the construction cost drew criticism, as it was 2% higher than that proposed by other firms. Fusselman found a supporter in Wisconsin State Assemblyman Carroll Metzner, a virulent opponent of Wright in Wisconsin who appeared with Fusselman on local radio in Marin to denounce Wright's "socialist" design philosophy. Fusselman was also supported by the local chapter of the American Legion. At the board meeting that confirmed Wright's appointment Legionniare Bryson Reinhardt read into the record a denunciation of Wright as a supporter of Communism during World War II, prompting an angry response from Wright, who threatened to walk away from the project. The county clerk, a Fusselman ally who had helped to organize the Legionnaires' protest, lost Wright's contract. A carbon copy of the contract was signed by the president of the Board of Supervisors, and Wright stayed. Opponents demanded a referendum on the design, which was counteracted by an effective public relations campaign by supporters. Wright was directed to proceed with detailed design on April 28, 1958. In March 1959 Wright was appointed to design the post office. On April 9, 1959, Wright died, aged 91. Supervisor Fusselman attempted to obtain the plans as they were at Wright's death and to cut the fee by 2%. Both efforts were unsuccessful. Design of the first phase was complete in September 1959, directed by Wesley Peters and Aaron Green. The low bidder was Rothschild, Raffin and Weirick of San Francisco for $3,638,735 for the building and $596,470 for site development.

Ground was broken on February 15, 1960 at a ceremony attended by Wright's widow, Olgivanna, Wright's son Lloyd Wright and grandson Eric Lloyd Wright, but not by Fusselman. The June 1960 election changed the makeup of the Marin County Board of Supervisors so that, in the following January, the new board voted to halt work on the project and possibly to convert it for use as a hospital, to replace a hospital that had been condemned. However, a poll by the Marin Independent Journal showing overwhelming support for the project pressured board members to change their minds. This, together with a negative report on conversion to hospital use by an independent architectural firm, led to the lifting of the stop-work order, construction resumed a week later. The contractor sued for time and money lost during the stoppage. There was no further political opposition. The post office was the first building to be completed, and was dedicated on May 19, 1962. The Administration Building was dedicated on October 13, 1962, again without Fusselman.

The Hall of Justice was financed by a special bond passed by referendum in 1965, which allocated $7.75 million to the $11.756 million cost of the new wing. Work by the contractor, Robert E. McKee of Dallas, Texas, was scheduled to be complete by October 1968. Strikes, bad weather, delivery problems for materials and design changes pushed the proposed completion to July 1969. The Hall of Justice was finally dedicated on December 13, 1969.

Landmark designation

In recognition of its exceptional design the Marin County Civic Center main building was listed on the National Register of Historic Places on July 17, 1991 and was designated a National Historic Landmark the same day. The designation as a National Historic Landmark came thirty years after completion of the first construction phase, compared with the more usual 50-year term before a site is considered eligible for the National Register. It is also a California Historical Landmark, Number 999. In 2015 and 2016, it and other Wright buildings were considered for designation as a UNESCO World Heritage Site. In 2016, the nomination to the World Heritage List was not approved by the UNESCO World Heritage Committee. A revised 2018 proposal removed the Marin County Civic Center from the list of nominated buildings. That list of Wright buildings was approved in 2019.

Attacks

In August 1970 the Civic Center, which houses the Marin County Superior Court, was the scene of an attempted jailbreak led by Jonathan Jackson, the brother of Black Panther militant George Jackson, demanding the release of the so-called "Soledad Brothers". Jackson released several prisoners in the courtroom and the group took a number of hostages, including the presiding judge, Harold Haley. While they were attempting to escape, four people, including Judge Haley and Jonathan Jackson, were killed. The story, which featured dramatic photographs, was carried in newspapers nationally. Black Panther activist Angela Davis was eventually tied to the case, prompting her to go on the run before being caught and ultimately acquitted on charges of supplying firearms to Jonathan Jackson. Aaron Green designed a landscaped area near the Hall of Justice as a memorial to Judge Haley. Later that same year, in October 1970, the Weather Underground detonated a bomb at the Courthouse in retaliation.

In popular culture

 The Marin County Civic Center was a filming location for director George Lucas's first feature-length film, THX 1138 (1971). Lucas would later use elements of the Civic Center's design as inspiration for structures on Naboo in the Star Wars prequel trilogy. The building also inspired concept designs for the yacht of Dryden Vos in Disney's Solo: A Star Wars Story (2018).

 On November 17, 1971, science-fiction author Philip K. Dick came to the police office, located in the building at the time, to report the theft of all his personal papers. Explosives were used to open his  fire proof safe. According to biographer Joel Margot: "He was convinced it was the CIA. This troubling event starts a paranoia in Dick's mind, for nothing of value has been taken away".

 Although parts of Peter Frampton's live album Frampton Comes Alive! (1976) are recorded during his performance at the Marin County Civic Center on June 13, 1975, the album also credits recordings in mid-to-late 1975 at Winterland Ballroom in San Francisco, the Long Island Arena in Commack, New York and a concert on the SUNY Plattsburgh campus in Plattsburgh, New York. 

 The Grateful Dead recorded their album In the Dark (1987) in front of an empty house at the Marin Veterans Memorial Auditorium. 

 The exterior and interior views of the buildings were featured in the science-fiction film Gattaca (1997). 

 Exterior views were pictured in the music video for the song "I Need a Doctor" by Dr. Dre from his album Detox. This place is also known for "Weird Al" Yankovic Live! concert on October 2, 1999 as a part of live video recording during his Running with Scissors tour. The DVD was released on November 23, 1999.

Gallery

Further reading

References

External links

Civic Center Library

Frank Lloyd Wright buildings
County government buildings in California
Buildings and structures in San Rafael, California
Government of Marin County, California
Government buildings completed in 1962
California Historical Landmarks
Government buildings on the National Register of Historic Places in California
National Register of Historic Places in Marin County, California
National Historic Landmarks in the San Francisco Bay Area
History of Marin County, California
Tourist attractions in Marin County, California
1960s architecture in the United States
Modernist architecture in California
San Francisco Bay Trail